Manuel Lazzari (born 29 November 1993) is an Italian professional footballer who plays as a right midfielder or right-back for  club Lazio and the Italy national team.

Club career

SPAL 
Following the merger with Giacomense, Lazzari joined SPAL. Lazzari made his professional debut in the Lega Pro for SPAL on 31 August 2014, in a game against Pontedera. He helped them to two successive promotions from Lega Pro to Serie A.

On 20 August 2017, he made his debut in the Serie A in a draw against Lazio. A week later, in the 3–2 win against Udinese, he scored his first Serie A goal. On 29 April 2018, during a match against Hellas Verona, Lazzari was injured in the medial collateral. He returned to the field on the last day of the championship, in which SPAL avoided relegation by beating Sampdoria 3–1.

During the following season, he became a permanent feature in Leonardo Semplici's starting eleven. He helped SPAL avoid relegation once again, also contributing to a record-eight assists.

Lazio 
On 12 July 2019, Lazzari moved to Lazio, in a deal worth €10m and Alessandro Murgia moving the other way.

Lazzari won his first trophy with Lazio on 22 December 2019, playing the full game in their 3–1 victory over Juventus in the 2019 Supercoppa Italiana, held at the King Saud University Stadium in Riyadh, Saudi Arabia.

International career
Lazzari was given his first senior international call-up for Italy in September 2018, by manager Roberto Mancini, for Italy's opening UEFA Nations League matches against Poland and Portugal later that month. On 10 September, Lazzari made his debut for Italy in the 1–0 away loss to Portugal.

Career statistics

Club

International

Honours
SPAL
 Serie B: 2016–17
 Lega Pro: 2015–16

Lazio
 Supercoppa Italiana: 2019

References

External links
 
 Profile at LegaSerieA.it 
 Profile at FIGC.it 

1993 births
Living people
People from Valdagno
Association football fullbacks
Association football midfielders
Italian footballers
Italy international footballers
L.R. Vicenza players
U.C. Montecchio Maggiore players
A.C. Delta Calcio Rovigo players
A.C. Giacomense players
S.P.A.L. players
S.S. Lazio players
Serie D players
Serie C players
Serie B players
Serie A players
Sportspeople from the Province of Vicenza
Footballers from Veneto